Gustavus T Smith (born c.1800 in England; died 6 January 1875 at Alderminster, Wiltshire) was an English amateur cricketer who played first-class cricket from 1815 to 1823.  Mainly associated with Marylebone Cricket Club (MCC), he made 5 known appearances in first-class matches.

References

External links
 CricketArchive profile

Sources

Further reading
 H S Altham, A History of Cricket, Volume 1 (to 1914), George Allen & Unwin, 1962
 Derek Birley, A Social History of English Cricket, Aurum, 1999
 Rowland Bowen, Cricket: A History of its Growth and Development, Eyre & Spottiswoode, 1970

1800 births
1875 deaths
English cricketers
English cricketers of 1787 to 1825
Marylebone Cricket Club cricketers
Hampshire cricketers
Marylebone Cricket Club Second 10 with 1 Other cricketers
Marylebone Cricket Club Second 9 with 3 Others cricketers